The 2009 Central American Junior and Youth Championships in Athletics were held at the Estadio Nacional Flor Blanca "Magico Gonzalez" in San Salvador, El Salvador, between May 16–17, 2009. Organized by the Central American Isthmus Athletic Confederation (CADICA), it was the 22nd edition of the Junior (U-20) and the 17th edition of the Youth (U-18) competition. A total of 80 (including 8 exhibition) events were contested, 41 (including 2) by boys and 39 (including 6) by girls.

Medal summary
Complete results can be found on the CADICA webpage.

Junior

Boys (U-20)

Girls (U-20)

†: Treated as exhibition contest (no medals and no points).

Youth

Boys (U-18)

†: Treated as exhibition contest (no medals and no points).

Girls (U-18)

†: Treated as exhibition contest (no medals and no points).

Medal table
The medal was published.

Team trophies
The placing table for team trophy awarded to the 1st place overall team (boys and girls categories) was published.

Overall

Participation
A total number of 218 athletes were reported to participate in the event.  Belize and Panamá did not send athletes.

  (53)
  (54)
  (81)
  (15)
  (15)

References

External links
 Official Website (in Spanish)

 
Central American Junior
Central American Junior
International athletics competitions hosted by El Salvador
Athl
2009 in youth sport